Red mistletoe is a common name for several species of plants and may refer to:

 Peraxilla tetrapetala, endemic to New Zealand
 Tapinanthus rubromarginatus, native to South Africa